Madelon Vriesendorp (born 1945 in Bilthoven) is a Dutch artist, painter, sculptor and art collector. She was married to Rem Koolhaas and best known as one of the co-founders of the Office of Metropolitan Architecture (OMA) in the early 1970s (together with Rem Koolhaas and Elia Zenghelis and Zoe Zenghelis). Vriesendorp would often create visuals and graphics for OMA in the early years.

Biography 
Madelon Vriesendorp was born 1945, Bilthoven, Netherlands. She attended Rietveld Academy in Amsterdam in 1964. In 1969, she attended classes at St. Martin’s School of Art in London.

For many years Vriesendorp contributed to Office of Metropolitan Architecture (OMA) by providing graphics and illustrations for the publications of their theoretical concepts. Her painting "Flagrant Delit" (English: Flagrant Crime) (1978) is recognizable and was used as the cover image for Delirious New York, written by Rem Koolhaas and first published in 1978. Flagrant Delit features the Empire State building and the Chrysler building of New York City, post coitus in bed together while outside the window an armless version of the Statue of Liberty looks sad. Vriesendorp noted that both buildings were built in the 1930s in New York City and were competing to be the tallest in the skyline, however the Empire State building appeared more masculine when compared to the Chrysler building. Koolhaas suggested she add in the Rockefeller Center catching the two buildings in the act, as a reference to Modernity.

Her largest artwork was a mural (1987–2015) on the stage tower of the Netherlands Dance Theatre in The Hague, however in 2015 the building and the mural was demolished.

"The World of Madelon Vriesendorp: Paintings/Postcards/Objects/Games" was a 40-year retrospective exhibition of the artist's career, curated by Shumon Basar and Stephan Trüby. It originated at the Architectural Association School of Architecture, London in 2008, and then toured to Aedes, Berlin; the Venice Biennale of Architecture; and finally the Swiss Architecture Museum, Basel. It was accompanied by a richly illustrated catalogue, and had contributions from Beatriz Colomina, Douglas Coupland, Hubert Damisch, Teri -Damisch, Zaha Hadid, Charles Jencks, Charlie Koolhaas, Hans Ulrich Obrist, Brett Steele and Fenna Haakma Wagenaar.

In 2018, she was awarded the Architectural Review, Ada Louise Huxtable Prize for her contributions to the architectural industry. Her acceptance speech for the award was political and talked about the "women written out of the script", because for many years Vriesendorps contributions to Office of Metropolitan Architecture (OMA) were not acknowledged.   

Madelon Vriesendorp lives in London and has two children, Charlie Koolhaas, a photographer, and Tomas Koolhaas, a filmmaker. She was previously married to Rem Koolhaas, they divorced in 2012.

Vriesendorp work is featured in various public art collections including Museum of Modern Art (MoMA), the FRAC Centre, among others.

Bibliography
Rem Koolhaas, Delirious New York: A Retroactive Manifesto for Manhattan, first edition. Oxford University Press, 1978
Shumon Basar, Stephan Trüby (eds.): The World of Madelon Vriesendorp, Architectural Association Publications, London, 2008

References

External links

Madelon Vriesendorp, Flagrant Délit (1975) and Freud Unlimited (1976), Canadian Centre for Architecture (digitized items)

1945 births
Living people
20th-century Dutch women artists
21st-century Dutch women artists
Dutch women painters
Dutch contemporary artists
People from De Bilt
Rem Koolhaas
Gerrit Rietveld Academie alumni
Alumni of Saint Martin's School of Art